The Republic of India uses only one time zone (even though it spans across two geographical time zones) across the whole nation and all its territories, called Indian Standard Time (IST), which equates to UTC+05:30, i.e. five and a half hours ahead of Coordinated Universal Time (UTC). India does not currently observe daylight saving time (DST or summer time).

The official time signal is given by the Time and Frequency Standards Laboratory. The IANA time zone database contains only one zone pertaining to India, namely Asia/Kolkata. The date and time notation in India shows some peculiarities.

Background

History

Ancient India 

The 4th century CE astronomical treatise Surya Siddhanta postulated a spherical earth.  The book described the thousands years old customs of the prime meridian, or zero longitude, as passing through Avanti, the ancient name for the historic city of Ujjain, and Rohitaka, the ancient name for Rohtak, a city near the Kurukshetra.

The day used by ancient Indian astronomers began at sunrise at the prime meridian of Ujjain, and was divided into smaller time units in the following manner:

 Time that is measurable is that which is in common use, beginning with the prāṇa (or, the time span of one breath).  The pala contains six prāṇas.  The ghalikā is 60 palas, and the nakṣatra ahórātra, or astronomical day, contains 60 ghalikās.  A nakṣatra māsa, or astronomical month, consists of 30 days.

Taking a day to be 24 hours, the smallest time unit, prāṇa, or one respiratory cycle, equals 4 seconds, a value consistent with the normal breathing frequency of 15 breaths/min used in modern medical research. The Surya Siddhanta also described a method of converting local time to the standard time of Ujjain. Despite these early advances, standard time was not widely used outside astronomy. For most of India's history, ruling kingdoms kept their own local time, typically using the Hindu calendar in both lunar and solar units. For example, the Jantar Mantar observatory built by Maharaja Sawai Jai Singh in Jaipur in 1733 contains large sundials, up to 90 ft (27 m) high, which were used to accurately determine the local time.

During British colonial rule 

In 1802 Madras Time was set up by John Goldingham and this was later used widely by the railways in India. Local time zones were also set up in the important cities of Bombay and Calcutta and as Madras time was intermediate to these, it was one of the early contenders for an Indian standard time zone. Though British India did not officially adopt the standard time zones until 1905, when the meridian passing east of Allahabad at 82.5° E longitude was picked as the central meridian for India, corresponding to a single time zone for the country (UTC+05:30). Indian Standard Time came into force on 1 January 1906, and also applied to Sri Lanka (then Ceylon). However, Calcutta Time was officially maintained as a separate time zone until 1948 and Bombay Time until 1955.

In 1925, time synchronisation began to be relayed through omnibus telephone systems and control circuits to organisations that needed to know the precise time. This continued until the 1940s, when time signals began to be broadcast using the radio by the government. Briefly during World War II, clocks under Indian Standard Time were advanced by one hour, referred to as War Time. This provision lasted from September 1, 1942, to October 15, 1945.

After independence
After independence in 1947, the Indian government established IST as the official time for the whole country, although Mumbai and Kolkata retained their own local time for a few more years. In 2014 Assamese politicians proposed following a daylight-saving schedule that would be ahead of IST by an hour, but as of March 2020 it has not been approved by the central government.

Former practices

Former timezones 

Older time zones, not in use any more since introduction of standardised same time zone across India, were:
Bombay Time (UTC+04:51)
Madras Time (UTC+05:21:14)
Calcutta Time (UTC+05:53:20)
Port Blair mean time (UTC+06:10:37)

Former daylight saving 

India and the Indian subcontinent observed "daylight saving (DST)" during the Second World War, from 1942 to 1945. During the Sino-Indian War of 1962 and the Indo–Pakistani Wars of 1965 and 1971, daylight saving was briefly used to reduce civilian energy consumption.

Present time zone 
India uses UTC+5:30, referred to as Asia/Kolkata in the IANA time zone database.

See also 
 Date and time notation in India 
 Hindu units of time
 History of measurement systems in India
 Daylight saving time
 Daylight saving time by country
 Time in India

References

 
Time in Asia
India